Rodney Ramagalela (born 10 January 1989) is a South African professional soccer player who last played as a forward for Premier Soccer League club Black Leopards.

Career
He started his professional career with Black Leopards before having spells with Mamelodi Sundowns and Golden Arrows. In 2016, he joined Polokwane City with whom he won the Lesley Manyathela Golden Boot in 2018, sharing the award with Sundowns' Percy Tau.

References

External links
Player's profile at absapremiership.co.za

1989 births
Living people
Sportspeople from Limpopo
South African soccer players
Association football forwards
Black Leopards F.C. players
Mamelodi Sundowns F.C. players
Lamontville Golden Arrows F.C. players
Polokwane City F.C. players
Highlands Park F.C. players
South African Premier Division players
2011 CAF U-23 Championship players